Rae Carson (born 1973) is an American fantasy writer.

Her debut novel, The Girl of Fire and Thorns, was published in 2011. It was a finalist for the William C. Morris YA Award and the  Andre Norton Award, and it was the winner of the Ohioana Book Award for Young Adult Literature. It was also selected as 2012 Top Ten Best Fiction for Young Adults by Young Adult Library Services Association. The series was a New York Times bestseller. Her books have also been translated into languages around the world. Beginning in 2017, she has written several tie-in stories for the Star Wars universe.

She is married to science fiction writer Charles Coleman Finlay.

Bibliography

Books
The Girl of Fire and Thorns Series
 The Girl of Fire and Thorns, 2011
 Crown of Embers, 2012
 The Bitter Kingdom, 2013
 The Girl of Fire and Thorns Stories, 2014
 The Empire of Dreams, 2020
The Gold Seer Trilogy
 Walk on Earth a Stranger, 2015
 Like a River Glorious, 2016
 Into the Bright Unknown, 2017
Other Novels
 Any Sign of Life, 2021

Short fiction
 "Omega Ship", in Three Sides of a Heart: Stories About Love Triangles, ed. by Natalie C. Parker, 2017
 "Badass Moms in the Zombie Apocalypse", in Uncanny Magazine, Jan-Feb 2020, ed. by Lynne M. Thomas and Michael Damian Thomas

Star Wars Universe
 "The Red One"; Star Wars: From a Certain Point of View (October 2017)
 "Hear Nothing, See Nothing, Say Nothing"; Star Wars: Canto Bight (December 2017)
 Most Wanted (2018)
 Star Wars: The Rise of Skywalker: Expanded Edition (2020)

Critical studies, reviews and biography
 Review of The bitter kingdom.

Awards and nominations

Hugo Awards 

 2021 - finalist for Best Short Story - "Badass Moms in the Zombie Apocalypse"

Nebula Awards 

 2020 - finalist for Best Short Story - "Badass Moms in the Zombie Apocalypse"

Andre Norton Award 

 2012 - finalist - The Girl of Fire and Thorns

Locus Awards 

 2021 - finalist for Best Short Story - "Badass Moms in the Zombie Apocalypse"
 2013 - finalist for Best Young Adult Book - The Crown of Embers
 2012 - finalist for Best First Novel - The Girl of Fire and Thorns

References

External links

 – "Rae Carson: Author of Books for Teens"

 Rae Carson at publisher HarperCollins
 

1973 births
Living people
American fantasy writers
American young adult novelists
American women novelists
21st-century American novelists
Women science fiction and fantasy writers
21st-century American women writers
Women writers of young adult literature